Irina Ilyenkova is a Belarus rhythmic gymnast. She won a silver medal at the 2000 Summer Olympics.

References 

Olympic gymnasts of Belarus
Olympic silver medalists for Belarus
Gymnasts at the 2000 Summer Olympics
Living people
Olympic medalists in gymnastics
Place of birth missing (living people)
Year of birth missing (living people)
Belarusian rhythmic gymnasts

Medalists at the 2000 Summer Olympics